Federalni Radio ("Federal Radio") is a Bosnian entity-level public radio station operated by Radio-Television of the Federation of Bosnia and Herzegovina (RTVFBiH).

The program is broadcast on a daily basis in Bosnian and Croatian. This radio station broadcasts a variety of programs such as news, music, talk shows, radio-drama, sports, mosaic and children's programs.

See also 
 List of radio stations in Bosnia and Herzegovina
 RTVFBiH
 Federalna Televizija

References

External links 
FTV official website
RTVFBiH official website

Communications in Bosnia and Herzegovina
Multilingual broadcasters
Publicly funded broadcasters
Radio stations established in 2001
Radio stations in Bosnia and Herzegovina
RTVFBIH